John Henry Dods (30 September 1875 – 30 December 1915) was a Scottish rugby union player. He also played for Edinburgh Academicals. He was the brother of Francis Dods who was also capped for Scotland.

Dods was killed along with his wife and three children, whilst on board , which suffered a series of explosions, killing hundreds of people.

Early life

Rugby career
Following the trials match on 28 December 1894, Dods was again selected for Scotland, to play against Wales on 25 January 1895.

International appearances

Death
On 30 December 1915, Dods, his wife and three children were aboard , guests of the ship's captain Eric Back. The ship, a Warrior Class cruiser, part of the Second Cruiser Squadron, was lying at anchor in the Cromarty Firth, in the north of Scotland. A series of explosions on board caused the ship to capsize with the loss of hundreds of lives, including those of Dods and his family.

See also
 List of international rugby union players killed in action during the First World War

References

Bibliography

External links
 
 Commonwealth War Graves database
 An entire team wiped out by the Great War (The Scotsman)

1875 births
1915 deaths
British military personnel killed in World War I
Edinburgh Academicals rugby union players
London Scottish F.C. players
Rugby union players from Glasgow
Scotland international rugby union players
Scottish rugby union players
Rugby union forwards